Malishevë is a village in the District of Gjilan, Kosovo. It is located southeast of Gjilan.

Notes and references

Notes

References

Villages in Gjilan